The Big Reunion is a 2013 series of concerts featuring British pop groups Five, 911, Atomic Kitten, Honeyz, Liberty X and Blue, and Irish group B*Witched. The groups, who were big names in the UK pop music scene in the late 1990s and early 2000s, reunited for the ITV2 reality-documentary series The Big Reunion (apart from Blue, who had already been reunited since 2011), a show which follows them meeting again for the first time in a decade and rehearsing ahead of their comeback performance.

Although the bands were initially only to perform a single concert at London's Hammersmith Apollo on 26 February 2013, high demand for tickets and the popularity of the series led to a full arena tour being announced. The arena tour consisted of 14 shows that took place during May 2013, although Blue only performed at four of these shows due to their own tour commitments. A "Big Pop Party" and a "Christmas party tour" were later announced as well. The Big Pop Party consisted of three gigs in separate months and the Christmas Party featured seven gigs in December.

Background
On 18 October 2012, it was announced that pop groups Five, 911, Atomic Kitten, B*Witched, Honeyz and Liberty X—who were big names in the UK pop music scene in the mid-to-late 1990s and early 2000s—would be reuniting for an ITV2 documentary series and a comeback performance at some point in 2013.

On 21 February 2013, it was revealed that a seventh band, Blue, would be joining The Big Reunion gig as well. When asked why they chose to join The Big Reunion, Blue said: "Phil Mount, the Big Reunions producer, has always been a long time supporter of the band, giving us our first TV break, he really wanted us to be surprise special guests announced halfway through the series and to perform on the Hammersmith Apollo show. This sounded like a lot of fun, giving us the perfect chance to perform together again in the UK for our fans and reconnect with the other acts, many of whom friends of ours and started out around the same time as us. For us the 'Big Reunion' is a great chance for all of us bands to come together for one BIG party on Tuesday night!"

The bands were originally only supposed to perform a one-off concert at London's Hammersmith Apollo on 26 February 2013, but when the entire show sold out in under five minutes shortly after the premiere of the first episode on 31 January 2013, rumours circulated that the show may become a full arena tour around the UK. On 11 February, it was confirmed that, following high ticket demands and the popularity of The Big Reunion, a full 12-date UK tour would be taking place from 3–14 May 2013. On 14 February shows were added in Dublin and Belfast, bringing the tour to a total of 14 shows. Blue will only be taking part in four of the 14 shows due to headlining their own arena tour.

On 27 March 2013, it was announced that the bands would perform a mini Christmas tour in December 2013. Five, Atomic Kitten, B*Witched, 911, Honeyz and Liberty X will all be taking part, but Blue will not as they will be headlining their own comeback tour. Three additional shows were announced on 23 April 2013.

Broadcast and recordings
The original Hammersmith Apollo show in February was recorded and parts of the concert, as well as backstage footage, aired on ITV2 on 28 March 2013 as The Big Reunion finale. The full concert was also released on DVD on 1 April 2013.

Setlist

{{hidden
| headercss = background: #ccccff; font-size: 100%; width: 90%;
| contentcss = text-align: left; font-size: 100%; width: 90%;
| header = Live Tour Setlist (without Blue) - 3 May - 17 May
| content =
Five
Medley: "We Will Rock You/Everybody Get Up"
"If Ya Gettin' Down"
B*Witched
"C'est La Vie"
"Rollercoaster"
911
Medley: "Party People...Friday Night/Love Sensation"
"A Little Bit More"
Honeyz
"Finally Found"
Medley: "Love of a Lifetime (Remix)/End of the Line"
Atomic Kitten
"Right Now"
Medley: "It's OK!/Be with You"
Liberty X
Medley: "Thinking It Over/Got to Have Your Love"
"Being Nobody"

INTERMISSION

Honeyz
"Won't Take It Lying Down"
"Never Let You Down"
911
"Bodyshakin'"
"More Than a Woman"
Liberty X
"Just a Little"
"Holding On For You"
B*Witched
"Jesse Hold On"
"Blame It on the Weatherman"
Five
"When the Lights Go Out"
"Keep On Movin'"
Atomic Kitten
"The Tide Is High (Get the Feeling)"
"Whole Again"
}}

Tour dates

Notes
Five, Blue, and Liberty X only. Part of Newmarket Nights' "Big Pop Party"
Blue will not be performing. Part of Butlin's "Back Together" music weekend.
Matinee and evening concerts

Reception
Almost 4,000 people attended the sold-out show at the Hammersmith Apollo on 26 February, for which tickets sold out almost immediately after going on sale. The entire 14-date arena tour quickly sold out as well.

The arena tour has received highly positive reviews from critics. Denise Evans gave the show in Manchester on 4 May, four out of five stars. "It was like watching a Smash Hits Poll Winners Party of old or an episode of Top of the Pops, which ultimately is exactly what the majority people singing and dancing along in the arena wanted. A bit of nostalgia.", she said. After attending the show in Nottingham on 10 May, Jayne Garfitt of thisisnottingham.com said "When it comes to revisiting the bands of your childhood the experience tends to tread a thin line between legendary and tragic. But that was not the case with the Big Reunion Tour. From the minute 5ive stepped on stage to the opening bars of Queen's "We Will Rock You", the atmosphere at the Capital FM Arena was electric. They might all be older and wiser but there is no doubt that these bands still have what it takes – slick dance moves, catchy lyrics and a great big sense of fun. Brilliant."

References

2013 concert tours